The Francis Marian Ames Farmstead is located in Rutland, Wisconsin. It was added to the State and the National Register of Historic Places in 1992.

In 1878 F.M. Ames bought this farmland from Samuel Axtell's estate. In 1892 he built the Queen Anne-styled house that stands today, two stories, clad mostly in clapboard. The gable ends contain diamond-shaped windows and are decorated with shingles, bargeboards and lattice-work at the peaks.  The porches are decorated with spindlework. Some of the windows are leaded glass.

The farmstead also includes some outbuildings:  a frame basement barn, a small animal shelter that was probably the lower level of another frame basement barn, and a garage that was probably used as horse and carriage barn.

References

Farms on the National Register of Historic Places in Wisconsin
National Register of Historic Places in Dane County, Wisconsin
Queen Anne architecture in Wisconsin
Houses completed in 1892
1892 establishments in Wisconsin